Khudig (Aghul: Худигъ) is a rural locality (a selo) in Kuragsky Selsoviet, Agulsky District, Republic of Dagestan, Russia. The population was 673 as of 2010.

Geography 
Khudig is located on the Koshanapu River, 21 km northeast of Tpig (the district's administrative centre) by road. Kurag is the nearest rural locality.

References 

Rural localities in Agulsky District